
Gmina Brzeźnica is a rural gmina (administrative district) in Żagań County, Lubusz Voivodeship, in western Poland.

Villages
Gmina Brzeźnica contains the villages and settlements of Brzeźnica, Chotków, Jabłonów, Karczówka, Marcinów, Przyborze, Przylaski, Stanów, Studnice, Trojanówka, Wichów, Wojsławice and Wrzesiny.

Neighbouring gminas
Gmina Brzeźnica is bordered by the gminas of Kożuchów, Nowogród Bobrzański and Żagań.

References

Brzeznica
Żagań County